There are over 20,000 Grade II* listed buildings in England. This page is a list of these buildings in the district of Bournemouth in Dorset.

List of buildings

|}

See also
Grade I listed buildings in Bournemouth

Notes

External links

Lists of Grade II* listed buildings in Dorset